Juan Manuel DeBiedma (born June 21, 1993), better known by his alias Hungrybox, is an Argentine-American professional Super Smash Bros. player and streamer. Recognized as one of the greatest and most successful Super Smash Bros. Melee players of all time, he is one of the "Five Gods" of Melee along with Adam "Armada" Lindgren, Jason "Mew2King" Zimmerman, Joseph "Mang0" Marquez, and Kevin "PPMD" Nanney, and is regarded as the greatest Jigglypuff player in Melee history. He is also an active competitor in Super Smash Bros. Ultimate, and he has been a member of Team Liquid since 2015. In December 2021 Hungrybox became co-owner of Team Liquid. 

Hungrybox has won several major Melee Singles tournaments, including Apex 2010, MLG World Finals 2015, EVO 2016, The Big House 7 (2017), The Big House 8 (2018), GENESIS 6 (2019), and 2017, 2018, and 2020 editions of Smash Summit. He has been ranked one of the top five Melee players in the world every year since formal rankings began in 2013, achieving the top rank a record three consecutive times from 2017 to 2019. A 2021 list compiled by PGstats ranked DeBiedma as the third-greatest Melee player of all time. Despite his "God" status, he is considered one of the most polarizing figures in the Melee community, in part due to the unpopularity of his defensive, counterattack-centric playstyle among part of the community.

Born in Argentina, DeBiedma grew up in Orlando, Florida, and became a U.S. citizen in 2017. Although he is known for competing mostly with Jigglypuff, he has briefly used Fox in Melee. Hungrybox has also competed in Super Smash Bros. games subsequent to Melee, including Project M and Ultimate professional tournaments. Although primarily known as a Singles player, he also has an extensive career in Melee Doubles, and partnered up with a variety of other players, most notably Mew2King and Justin "Plup" McGrath, both of whom he won major Doubles tournaments with; he has been managed by his lifelong best friend Luis "Crunch" Rosias for the entirety of his career.

Early life 
Juan Manuel DeBiedma was born in Argentina on June 21, 1993, from Juan Daniel Debiedma, a diplomat for Argentina, and Lucia Violante, a flight attendant. He has two older brothers, Gaston, the oldest, and Fermin. In the mid-1990s, DeBiedma's family moved to Orlando, Florida, after which Violante became a real estate agent.

DeBiedma played piano and sang a capella while growing up. He discovered video games at a young age, particularly enjoying the Super Mario Advance series, and started playing Melee when he was little after the stepson of one of his father's co-workers introduced him to the game. He would also often play Super Smash Bros. Brawl with Fermin. DeBiedma and his lifelong best friend and future manager, Luis "Crunch" Rosias, met in fifth grade in Orlando, and would often play Melee together. He originally used Ness as his main character, but switched to Jigglypuff after realizing the effectiveness of the "Rest" move.

His eventual "Hungrybox" name came from middle school, after he failed to forge his mother's signature, producing something resembling a drawing instead. He kept on re-creating the drawing when bored in class, eventually resulting in a "hungry box" character resembling a box with eyes and a jagged mouth.

DeBiedma was abandoned by his father Juan Daniel when he was 15 years old; the last time they saw each other was when Juan Daniel dropped him to the venue for the Brawl tournament Fast 1 on July 20, 2008, after which Juan Daniel returned to Argentina, and they never met again.

Esports career

Early career (2007–2013) 
DeBiedma discovered the Super Smash Bros. competitive scene around 2006–2007 and started to perform at small local tournaments in 2007. In July 2008, he volunteered to host several players at his parent's home for the upcoming 122-player Brawl tournament named Fast 1. He himself took part of the tournament, finishing in 25th place.

In 2009 at a local Tampa tournament, Twilight Showdown 6, he placed 3rd for the first time in any tournament, earning $27.50, his first prize money; he recognizes this as the first moment he considered becoming professional. After finishing in 7th place at Revival of Melee on March 7, Hungrybox placed 3rd at GENESIS for Melee on July 11, his first high placement at a major Melee tournament, while placing 97th on Brawl the following day. Hungrybox won his first-ever tournament at Revival of Melee 2 on November 21, 2009. He then went on to place in high positions repeatedly on tournaments, with Apex 2010 on August 8 marking his first win in a major tournament.

For the following years, Hungrybox remained one of the top Melee players, and established himself as the best Jigglypuff player in the world. Results in major tournaments included placing 2nd at both Apex 2012 and The Big House 3 in 2013. He won both the Singles and Doubles tournaments at CEO 2010 (with ChuDat in Doubles), and then again at CEO 2011 (with Linguini in Doubles). In parallel, he continued to compete on Brawl, to lesser success, and on the Brawl mod Project M, winning several minor tournaments.

Early "Five Gods" Era (2013–2017) 
In 2013, Evo, the most prominent fighting game event worldwide, announced Melee as part of the Evo 2013 line-up, after the game had only previously been featured at Evo 2007. The event is considered the full beginning of the "Era of the Five Gods" (or "Platinum" Era), which marked a surge in prominence and popularity for the Melee competitive scene, and its near-total domination by five players: Hungrybox, Adam "Armada" Lindgren, Jason "Mew2King" Zimmerman, Joseph "Mango" Marquez, and Kevin "PPMD" Nanney, with every Melee tournament ranked Supermajor (the highest rating for a Smash tournament) or Major (the second-highest) for several consecutive years being won by one of the "Gods", and them rarely losing to anyone but another "God". At Evo 2013, Hungrybox finished in 3rd place, losing to Wobblez in the Losers Finals after a controversial finish; in parallel, he took part in a Melee Doubles Evo side-event, teaming up with Mew2King to win the tournament.

On July 3, 2013, Hungrybox was picked up by team CLASH Tournaments alongside fellow Super Smash Bros. player Aziz "Hax" Al-Yami. On April 17 of the following year, he left CLASH Tournaments and joined Team Curse. On January 6, 2015, Team Curse merged with Team Liquid, leading Hungrybox to be picked up by Team Liquid along with his teammate Kashan "Chillin" Khan, joining other Smash Bros. players Ken Hoang and Daniel "KoreanDJ" Jung.

In 2014, Hungrybox placed top three in nine Melee tournaments, including a victory at Fight Pitt V. At Evo 2014, he reached the Grand Finals for the first time, losing to Mango and finishing in 2nd place; he once again won the Doubles side-event, this time teaming up with Justin "Plup" McGrath.

In 2015, Hungrybox won the Melee Singles tournament at Paragon, defeating Mew2King in the Grand Finals. At Evo 2015 in July, he finished in 2nd place, losing to Armada in the Grand Finals; the following month, he announced that he would be becoming less active in competitive Smash, as he began his career as an engineer. At Paragon Los Angeles, his next tournament after Evo, he finished 3rd in Melee after being eliminated by Mew2King with a score of 2–3. In parallel to his Melee career, he competed on the newly released Super Smash Bros. for Nintendo 3DS and Super Smash Bros. for Wii U to little success; at Paragon Los Angeles in 2015, the largest Project M tournament in history, Hungrybox finished 4th after being defeated by Mew2King 3–1.

DreamHack Winter 2015 from November 26 to November 29, 2015, marked Hungrybox' first time winning both the Singles and Doubles tournaments at a Super Major event, winning Singles by defeating Armada 3–1 in the second set of Grand Finals after losing 3–0 in the first set, and Doubles by teaming up with Axe to defeat DaJuan "Shroomed" McDaniel and McCain "MacD" LaVelle 3–1 in the grand finals. His win in the Singles tournament earned him $10,000, his first five-figure payout; he broke into tears during his post-match interview. In early 2016, Hungrybox won two additional singles Super Major tournaments, Pound and CEO 2016.

On July 17, 2016, Hungrybox participated in the Evo 2016 Melee tournament and reached the Grand Finals for the third consecutive year, against Armada for a second consecutive time. In the Grand Finals, Hungrybox won two consecutive best of five sets, both with a score of 3–2, to win Evo for the first time in his career.

The following October, Hungrybox competed at The Big House 6, where he placed 5th, losing to Armada in the Losers Quarter-Finals; although he had been juggling his entire e-sports career with full studies and/or working, Hungrybox, disappointed by his performance, decided to quit his job as process engineer for WestRock to become a full-time professional player for the first time.

Domination of Melee (2017–2020) 
In 2017, Hungrybox won multiple tournaments, including the Supermajor tournament The Big House 7, and four Super Major tournaments: Shine 2017, DreamHack Austin 2017, DreamHack Denver 2017, and Smash Summit 5; for the latter, he set a new record for most money won in a single Melee tournament, receiving $29,315.30 as prize money.

In 2018, Hungrybox continued to consistently rank high on tournaments, winning a total of 18, including three Supermajors: Shine 2017, CEO 2018, and The Big House 8. At Evo 2018, Hungrybox lost to Armada in the Losers Semifinals and ranked 4th. Hungrybox would go on to score five consecutive tournaments wins at the end of the year, including the Singles tournament at Smash Summit 7 on November 15.

In February 2019, Hungrybox won GENESIS 6, his first GENESIS win after participating in all five previous editions of the Singles Melee tournament. He went on to win more Super Majors, including Pound 2019, Low Tier City 7, CEO 2019, Shine 2019, and Mainstage.

Following the release of Super Smash Bros. Ultimate in December 2018, Hungrybox started entering Ultimate tournaments as part of events in which he was also competing as a Melee player; his Ultimate endeavors were less successful. In his first Ultimate tournament, the 385-entrant Ultimatum on December 29, he finished in 65th place. At GENESIS 6, the biggest Ultimate tournament at that point with 2105 entrants, Hungrybox placed 193rd in Singles, and 257th in Doubles with Kashan "Chillindude" Khan. His best Ultimate ranking for 2019 was at Mango's Birthday Bash, where he finished in 7th place; in addition, he performed as a Melee player, finishing 2nd in both singles and Doubles tournaments (teaming up with Zain for the latter).

COVID-19 and Ultimate (2020–2021) 
Hungrybox won GatorLAN Spring 2020, before finishing 2nd at GENESIS 7 after losing to Zain in the Singles Grand Finals, while teaming up with him to rank 5th in Doubles. He went on to win Smash Summit 9 in February. At CEO Dreamland, he won both the Singles tournament, and the Doubles tournament with Kilmer "mayb" Varela.

He won his first Ultimate tournament by finishing 1st in The Salad Online 13's Ultimate Singles bracket.

Starting in March 2020  the COVID-19 pandemic caused the Smash community to either cancel events or move them online. Due to Melee not having an online mode, the Melee community became de facto inactive, apart from tournaments using a fan-made online mod of Melee. Hungrybox failed to win any for the rest of the year. He achieved his worst Melee placement in 13 years in July at LACS 2, finishing 13th. The following November at Perfect Series 3: ONLINE on November 3, he finished in 17th place.

Return to in-person competition (2021–present) 
From July 15 to July 18, 2021, Hungrybox took part in the Melee Major tournament Smash Summit 11, the first offline Super Smash Bros. Major in North America since Frostbite in February 2020. At the end of the three-day singles tournament, he took third place, losing to Zain in the winner's finals and then to eventual tournament winner Mang0 in the loser's finals. He and Plup also took 2nd place in a special single-elimination doubles tournament where players could only pick each character once per set, losing to Mang0 and SFAT in the finals. Mang0's first-place prize in the singles tournament of $46,700 surpassed the all-time record of $29,315 Hungrybox had earned for winning Smash Summit 5 in 2017.

At Riptide on September 10–12, 2021, Hungrybox took third place in the singles tournament after losing to iBDW in Winners Finals and to Plup in Losers Finals. He and Plup also won the doubles tournament. Hungrybox and four of his fellow Team Liquid members became co-owners of the team in December.

On July 3rd, 2022, Hungrybox won the Canadian international tournament Get On My Level 2022, marking his first career victory at a major tournament in two and a half years since his last major win at Smash Summit 9 in February 2020.

Style and public image

Playstyle 
Largely credited with elevating the Melee community's perception of Jigglypuff's viability in competition and setting the standard of how to play the character, Hungrybox relies heavily on a defensive, counterattack-centric playstyle revolving around avoiding his opponent until he finds an opportunity to attack and capitalize on their mistakes; it is considered a "high-risk high-reward" playstyle, as Hungrybox's usual goal is to eventually hit his opponent with "Rest", a move unique to Jigglypuff which inflicts instant high knockback on opponents. The move has a very small range, making it hard to connect, and, regardless of whether it successfully hits or not, leaves Jigglypuff asleep and completely vulnerable for three seconds afterwards; as such, failure to connect with "Rest", or failure to knock the opponent far enough to kill them, can result in massive damage inflicted on Jigglypuff, or, if damage is already high, in an instant kill; sometimes, Jigglypuff does not wake up fast enough to avoid getting attacked even if the opponent did lose their stock, leaving Hungrybox little room for mistakes during a game.

Hungrybox claimed in 2013 that he "got good using gimmicks" and that his hands were not fast enough for technical skill. Liking Melee for its "unorthodox value", he claimed in 2014 that he disliked traditional head-to-head fighting game. In 2014, he stated: "In my playstyle, I'm a greedy novel editor".

Hungrybox has earned the nickname "Clutchbox" due to his frequent clutch performances, pulling off comebacks when in difficult positions, particularly when in the middle of losing sets or after being sent to a Losers Bracket.

Public perception 
Hungrybox is unanimously seen as one of the best players in Melee history, as well as the best Jigglypuff player in the game's history. However, he has remained a polarizing figure for Melee fans and players all throughout his career, with part of the community criticizing his playstyle as annoying and too slow and Jigglypuff as a bad character; he has also been accused of hurting the community, with some alleging that his playstyle was driving viewers away. ESPN stated in 2016: "There is no question that Juan 'Hungrybox' Debiedma is the most polarizing figure in the realm of Super Smash Bros. Melee. Ten years deep as a competitor, he's seen fans discount him, his performances, and his character selection, some even believing that he's killing the game with each set." In another article in 2019, they stated that he "has been the recipient of a significant amount of hate throughout his career."

Hungrybox also attracted criticism for his tendency to loudly and flashily celebrate his wins (called "pop-offs" within the community), which some considered disrespectful to his defeated opponents. According to Hungrybox, the Melee community's partial rejection of his playstyle started very early in his career, claiming that "people didn't like that at all" when he started placing high in local tournaments in 2008.

He has admitted to suffering from the way part of the community treats him, also stating that the community's perception of him was a factor in him starting to drink excessively in 2017 and resuming having a day job despite being the No. 1 Melee player in the world.

In the Grand Finals of DreamHack Austin 2017 in which he faced Daniel "ChuDat" Rodriguez in several highly contested games described by ESPN as "high-level spectacle", Hungrybox won the final game, and therefore the tournament, by camping and avoiding contact with ChuDat's Ice Climbers until the clock ran out, giving Hungrybox the win due to his statistical advantage in stocks and damage ratio. Afterward, ChuDat refused to shake Hungrybox's hand. Bleeding Cool reported the event with the headline "DreamHack Austin Champion Wins In The Most Pathetic Way Possible". In April 2018, Hungrybox claimed on Twitter that a stranger attracted his attention while he was shopping at Walmart earlier during the day, before saying "Fuck you and your family Hungrybox", as well as "some other stuff about [him]".

Controversial tournament events 
Hungrybox's match against Zac "SFAT" Cordoni in the Losers Semifinals at Evo 2017 attracted controversy after Hungrybox called his coach, Luis "Crunch" Rosias, over for advice in between games, which was as a violation of the event's "No Coaching After Pools" rule; as the discussion between Hungrybox and Crunch was ongoing, Gordon "G$" Connell, a friend of SFAT, approached and mocked the other two by mimicking a coach-like discussion with SFAT. As the result, Evo considered that both players had violated the rule, and let the match's original result, a win for Hungrybox, stand; both players nevertheless received a yellow card as punishment for their actions. This upset part of the fans, who believed that, as SFAT was not actually being coached, he should have won by disqualification. Others pointed out that, according to the official Evo ruleset, if such an incident is not reported at the time it took place, then it is ignored, and that, as neither Hungrybox nor SFAT reported the other, neither should have been carded in the first place. Hungrybox eventually lost the following round, the Losers Finals, against Mango, finishing 3rd in the tournament while SFAT placed 4th as the result of his loss.

One of the most infamous moments in Melee history took place in April 2019 at Pound 2019, when, after Hungrybox won the Melee Singles tournament by defeating Mango in the Grand Finals, a member in the crowd, presumably upset by his win, threw a dead crab at Hungrybox, barely missing him. After a moment of incredulousness, an infuriated Hungrybox picked up the crab and shouted at the crowd, asking the person who threw it to reveal themselves and "show some respect." The individual in question was later identified and ejected from the building, with a Pound official announcing that they had been permanently banned from future Pound events and that their name would be privately disclosed to other Smash tournament organizers. Hungrybox then apologized on Twitter for losing his temper, later stating: "I was just so disappointed. I looked down and I’m like 'who threw this? Why would you throw this at me?'", later making fun of the incident by eating a crab during a live stream. The crab incident became viral and was relayed by a variety of media outlets, quickly becoming a meme within the Smash community.

Personal life
After abandoning his family to return in Argentina in 2008, Hungrybox's father Juan Daniel passed away from a heart attack in late 2015, shortly before Hungrybox won both the Singles and Doubles Melee tournaments at DreamHack Winter 2015, earning his first five-figure payout and marking his first time winning both Singles and Doubles at a Super Major tournament; in a post-win interview, he broke into tears and opened about his father's lack of support. According to Hungrybox, his mother, Lucia Violante, was conversely very supportive.

Hungrybox's lifelong best friend and manager is Luis "Crunch" Rosias, whom Hungrybox credits with training him and helping him develop his skills at Melee, most notably in how to win against Fox, who is often considered the best character in the game, and has a notoriously favorable matchup against Hungrybox's character, Jigglypuff.

While competing professionally in Melee, DeBiedma continued to be a full-time student, graduating Freedom High School in 2011, and the University of Florida with a bachelor's degree in chemical engineering in 2015; after getting his degree, he relocated from Jacksonville, Florida to Buford, Georgia, and then again to Demopolis, Alabama, in order to find work that could still allow him to continue his full-time Super Smash Bros. career. In 2015, he began working as a process engineer for WestRock, but quit his job the following year after underperforming at The Big House 6, in order to pursue a full-time eSports career. In March 2018, however, the decline of his mental health in 2017 following his break-up lead him to take a regular job once again at ServiceNow in Florida, due to feeling that the Melee community's perception also weighed heavily on him. In June 2019, after winning CEO for the fourth time, he announced that he would be leaving the workforce to pursue eSports full-time once again. On August 15, 2017, DeBiedma became a U.S. citizen.

Awards and nominations

Notable tournament placings
Only Majors and Supermajors are listed.

Super Smash Bros. Melee

Project M

Super Smash Bros. Brawl

Super Smash Bros. for Wii U

Super Smash Bros. for 3DS

Super Smash Bros. Ultimate

Media
DeBiedma's early Melee career was documented in an episode of the 2013 documentary series The Smash Brothers. He also is present in another documentary about the competitive Smash scene called Metagame. Hungrybox has been a vocal advocate for the competitive Super Smash Bros. scene, praising the technological advancements created for Melee, and criticizing Nintendo for their lack of support towards the community.

Notes

References

External links

1993 births
Living people
American esports players
Super Smash Bros. Melee players
People from Gainesville, Florida
People from Orlando, Florida
American people of Argentine descent
American chemical engineers
University of Florida College of Engineering alumni
Team Liquid players
Team Curse players
Team Razer players
People with acquired American citizenship
Super Smash Bros. Ultimate players
Super Smash Bros. for Wii U players
Project M players